Brodar mac Torcaill (1104 – 1 July 1160), also known as Brodar Mac Turcaill, was a late twelfth century King of Dublin. He was a member of the Meic Torcaill, a substantial landholding kindred in the kingdom. His death in 1160, at the hands of the Meic Gilla Sechnaill of South Brega, is revealed by the thirteenth-century Cottonian Annals, the seventeenth-century Annals of the Four Masters, the fifteenth- to sixteenth-century Annals of Ulster, and the fourteenth-century Annals of Tigernach.

Citations

References

Primary sources

Secondary sources

|-

1160 deaths
12th-century Irish monarchs
Meic Torcaill
Monarchs of Dublin
Norse-Gaels
Year of birth unknown